Brachyvatus is a genus of beetles in the family Dytiscidae, containing the following species:

 Brachyvatus acuminatus (Steinheil, 1869)
 Brachyvatus apicatus (Clark, 1862)
 Brachyvatus bituberculata (Guignot, 1958)
 Brachyvatus borrei (Sharp, 1882)

References

Dytiscidae genera